Pirate radio exists in most countries in Europe.

Belgium (from international waters) 
(See also Netherlands; many Dutch language stations were aimed at both countries)

1962
Radio Antwerpen broadcast from the concrete vessel Uilenspiegel. Owner Georges De Caluwé died in December that year, and three days later the ship broke its anchor and ran aground across the border in the Netherlands.

1973
Radio Atlantis broadcast in Dutch from the Merchant vessel Mi Amigo. When its contract was taken over by Radio Mi Amigo, Radio Atlantis transferred to the MV Jeanine in 1974 and added an English service, but its signal was poor and it closed on 31 August, the day before the passage of the Dutch MOA, one hour after Radio Veronica and one hour before RNI.

1974
Radio Mi Amigo broadcast in Dutch from the MV Mi Amigo (Radio Caroline's ship) 1974–1978, and from the MV Magdalena (1979).

Denmark 
1958
Radio Mercur begins transmissions from the MV Cheeta on 2 August.

1961
DCR (Danmarks Commercielle Radio) begins transmissions from the MV Lucky Star on 15 September. DCR later united with Radio Mercur.

1962
Radio Mercur ends transmissions due to a Danish law that prohibits assistance to illegal broadcasting directed to a Danish audience.

2006
Pirat radio 69 was located in the activist house "Ungdomshuset" in Copenhagen from 14 December 2006 to 1 March 2007.

2012
Byens Radio 89,7fm started broadcasting in central, Northern and Southern Copenhagen with micro powered radio equipment, inspired by Mbanna Kantako and his family from humanrightsradio.net (Springfield, Illinois, USA). It went on a week-long break starting mid-February 2012 after a detection van was spotted near the broadcasting site. As of 15 May 2012, Byens Radio has been broadcasting for the second longest period of time, for a pirate radio station in Denmark. The longest being Radio Mercur. Though it is the longest lasting non-commercial pirate radio station in the history of Denmark.
The leftwing activist website Modkraft.dk  has evidence that Byens Radio broadcast from 31 December. The police's detection van never got close enough to stop the actual broadcasting but only encouraged the activist group behind the radio to move the broadcasting site elsewhere in order to avoid getting evicted. By moving from one base to another several times, the broadcasters were never found. Many newspaper articles and web sites document its existence and some of the original broadcasting is represented online. Byens Radio resumed transmission as of 4 November 2013.

Finland 
In Finland, most pirate radio stations operated in the 1970s and the early half of the 1980s, because Yleisradio was the only legitimate broadcaster. In 1985, licenses were granted for local FM radio stations, which were able to offer a much wider variety of music, thus lessening the need for pirate radio stations. Since the end of the 1990s, FM piracy in Finland has all but died out.

France (history of pirate radio) 
The first wave was a political movement based mainly within French territory.  Most of these stations were short-lived. The first wave included Radio Verte, Radio Ivre, Radio Active and Radio Lorraine Coeur d'Acier. A few, such as Radio Verte Fessenheim became licensed stations.
 1978
In January 1978, the DST arrested eleven people accused of radio piracy. In May, the President of the Republic, Valéry Giscard d'Estaing asked the government to put an end to pirate radio stations. On 17 May, the Lecat law confirmed the monopoly of state radio stations and toughened the penalties for offenders.

 1981-1983
The socialist opposition supports the fight of free radios for freedom of expression without promising the end of the monopoly. In 1981, after the election of François Mitterrand, the law of 29 July 1982 on audiovisual communication abolishes the state monopoly and authorizes free radios. In February 1983, 22 stations obtained authorization to broadcast in Paris.
From 1982, a High Authority for Audiovisual Communication was created and replaced in 1986 by the National Commission for Communication and Liberties (CNCL). The frequency authorizations issued by the CNCL in 1987 are the subject of several scandals: several commercial stations to the detriment of free radios and non-commercial associative radios; but also the lack of transparency in the choice of frequencies. A small associative station, Radio Laser, which is one of the radio stations excluded, thus initiates a lawsuit against Radio Courtoisie for "active corruption" of the CNCL and the members of the CNCL are at the same time prosecuted for "confiscation". Weakened by these controversies, the CNCL was replaced in 1989 by the Superior Council of the Audiovisual which obtains increased competences, a greater independence of action in order to regulate the allocation of frequencies, ensure the quality of transmissions and better legal support to apply these decisions.

Hungary (history of pirate radio) 
1942–44 

1991 Tilos Rádió, Szokol Rádió, Fiksz Rádió, and Zöm Rádió

2020 RiseFM

Ireland (history of pirate radio) 
See Irish pirate radio.

Italy 
In early 70's some pirate radio started to broadcast using FM.
They were illegal till a decision of the supreme court in 1976 decided that every citizen has a right to broadcast on radio (and the government was supposed to be in charge of a new plan of frequency).

See Radio Alice, linked to the Autonomist movement.

Netherlands
(See also Belgium)

1960–1974
Radio Veronica transmitted in Dutch on AM mediumwave (192 meter, 1562 kHz; later 538 meter, 557 kHz) from the MV Borkum Riff and after 1965 from the MV Norderney in international waters off the coast of Scheveningen, and soon became the most popular radio station in the Netherlands. Broadcasts were targeted to the Netherlands only, transmitting power was deliberately kept moderate to avoid interference with international radio stations. Most broadcasts were recorded on shore in Hilversum. The station operated from April 1960 until August 1974, when the Dutch ratification of the Strassbourg treaty came into effect, after which Radio Veronica—then called VOO—became part of the regular Dutch broadcasting system, but was unable to retain its popularity. Radio Veronica is now an independent radio station

1964
Radio Noordzee and TV Noordzee transmitted in Dutch from REM Island, an artificial construction resembling an early offshore oil platform. It was built in the Republic of Ireland and towed into a position off the coast of the Netherlands where it was assembled on site. The two stations were short lived and were forcibly closed by an air and sea attack by the Dutch Armed Forces. However, the funds solicited from the project by the REM island project were later used to launch a legitimate and fully licensed station in the Netherlands.

1970
Radio Noordzee Internationaal (RNI) broadcasting on AM, FM and international shortwave from the MV Mebo II which was originally anchored off the Netherlands. The ship moved for a time off the coast of south-eastern England where it was jammed by a Royal Navy transmitter. The vessel then returned to the Netherlands. The owners of this station were involved in the Nigerian Civil War: (Biafra) and a complicated involvement with the sale of electronic equipment that featured in the trial of the men responsible for the Pan Am Flight 103 Lockerbie bombing. The end came for the MV Mebo II when the owners sold their offshore station to Libya as a revolutionary radio station. In the end Libya blew the vessel up and sank it for target practice.

1970
Capital Radio aboard the MV King David. No connection to the legal British commercial radio group of the same name.

1978
Radio Delmare aboard the MV Martina. This vessel also took a generator to "Radio Caroline" then using the MV Mi Amigo.

1981
Radio Paradijs made test broadcasts only from the MV Magda Maria (Lieve) which was anchored off the Netherlands before the station was forcibly closed.

1984-1987
Radio Monique aboard Radio Caroline's MV Ross Revenge.

1988-1989
Radio 819 (originally Radio 558 prior to a frequency change) from the MV Ross Revenge.

1980–present
There are still many Dutch pirate radio stations, mostly located in rural areas. It has been claimed that in 2011 approx 50% of all European Pirate Stations are located in the East-Netherlands. Especially the provinces of Overijssel, Friesland and Drenthe have a lot of pirate stations, as well as western Brabant. Most of the pirate radio stations air the so called "pirate music", traditional Dutch folk music combined with classic English, German and Polka. These can be found particularly 1611 to 1700 kHz (This is called the X-Band.) Like many other European countries another hotspot is the 48 meter-band on Shortwave radio. The frequency is 6200-6500 kHz. Some can be found in the American part of the band (6900-7000) but is rare. There are about ~40 Pirate radio stations based in the Netherlands alone.

Poland 
In the 1980s, there were hundreds of short broadcasts of pre-recorded programs prepared and aired by a clandestine network of activists who called themselves Solidarity Radio (Radio Solidarność). Those programs, sometimes preceded by a leaflet campaign announcing an up-coming broadcast, were part of the broad-based Solidarity (Solidarność) workers, pro-democracy movement, which eventually succeeded in overcoming communism in Poland. Many Solidarity Radio organizers served time in prison for their activities.

Sweden 
Early 1950s to 31 May 1952; Black Peter was run by the brothers John and Gunnar Figaro from their home in Lomsjö, a small village in southern Lappland. The transmission was suspected to transmit information from espionage resulting in a major hunt. 
1958
Skånes Radio Mercur, later renamed to Radio Syd from the MV "Cheeta" and later the MV "Cheeta II" which was also used at various times by TV Syd and for a time Radio Caroline South while the ship was anchored off South-east England. See: Radio Syd webpages Radio Syd was shut down in January 1966 and the owner, Britt Wadner, moved to Gambia where she started a land based Radio Syd in May 1970 using the antenna from "Cheeta II" .

1961
Radio Nord broadcasting in Swedish from the MV Bon Jour (later renamed Magda Maria and Mi Amigo). This station was the behind-the-scenes creation of American Top 40 broadcasting pioneer Gordon McLendon and Clint Murchison, owner of the Dallas Cowboys football team, both from Dallas, Texas. See: Pictures of the ship, transmitter & personnel and "The true Pirate Story"

As the MV Mi Amigo, this radio ship would later be used to transmit under the names of: Radio 199; Radio Veronica; Radio Atlantis; Radio Seagull, Radio Mi Amigo and Radio Caroline.

United Kingdom

From international waters 
1928
Ceto—The Ceto was a steam yacht reportedly renamed "Broadcasting Yacht" and fitted out for radio broadcasting purposes in 1928. Starting from off the coast of Dundee, Scotland, 'Daily Mail Radio/Radio Daily Mail' (reports vary) broadcast easy listening music to various points around the British coast as it cruised around the nation's coastline.  The sole sponsors of this voyage were Britain's Daily Mail, Evening News, and Sunday Dispatch newspapers, and the intent was not so much to set up an offshore station but rather to publicise the papers. The brain behind this publicity stunt was Valentine Smith, the Daily Mail's publicity officer.

1960
CNBC—(Commercial Neutral Broadcasting Company) made test broadcasts in English from the MV Borkum Riff anchored off the Netherlands and also the home of the Dutch station Radio Veronica. The target audience was in south-eastern England, but due to the low power and distance the programs were not successful and they were terminated after a short period of time. However, the experiment gave rise to two other ventures which were planned for vessels anchored off the coast of south-eastern England.

The first was GBLN which was also known as the Voice of Slough and the primary geographical target area of the transmissions. This vessel was to be based aboard the MV Ellen. What made this station notable was the fact that U.S. evangelist Herbert W. Armstrong, who financed by his daily paid broadcasts many of the successful offshore stations which followed, believed in the project to the extent that his broadcast called The World Tomorrow was listed in the radio log of his worldwide magazine (The Plain Truth), as being heard at 8 p.m. daily at 306 metres in the medium wave: (AM).
Almost at the same time a spin-off venture from GBLN was created by GBOK which intended to broadcast from a former lightship known as the Lady Dixon. Although the mainstream press reported on both stations at the time, neither venture came on the air.

1964
Radio Caroline began broadcasting on 28 March from aboard the MV Caroline (formerly MV Fredericia) anchored off south-eastern England, later moved to anchorage off Isle of Man. The first voices from Radio Caroline included Simon Dee, Carl Conway, John Junkin and Chris Moore. Some of the first programmes were recorded on land and taken out to the ship to be played as live.

Radio Atlanta began broadcasting on 12 May from aboard the MV Mi Amigo from an anchorage close to Radio Caroline. The Mi Amigo had been previously used by Radio Nord to broadcast to Sweden. On 2 July 1964, Radio Caroline and Radio Atlanta agreed upon forming the Caroline Network while retaining independent owners of each station. As a result of this agreement Radio Caroline on board the MV Caroline sailed north, while the MV Mi Amigo remained at her original anchorage off south-eastern England using the callsign Radio Caroline South. Upon its arrival the now renamed Radio Caroline North broadcast to the north of England, the Isle of Man, Ireland and a large part of Scotland.

Radio London began broadcasting from a former US minesweeper renamed MV Galaxy anchored in British territorial waters off South-east England. Following a warning from Radio Caroline, the station moved to a new location almost alongside Radio Caroline. "Big L", as it was known, was the most successful UK commercial radio station from within months of its start right up to its closedown in 1967, although by this time Radio Caroline was regaining lost ground.

The station gained its 'Wonderful' appendage because it used a set of custom-recorded PAMS jingles made in Dallas, Texas. The Radio London format was later copied by the BBC to create Radio One and The Who incorporated the jingles into their album The Who Sell Out. Big L, as the station was fondly called, followed a similar format to KLIF in Dallas where the station had been financed by car dealers and oil men who were friends and business associates of Don Pierson of Eastland, Texas.

Radio Invicta broadcasting from Red Sands Fort, an abandoned WWII British Army fortress on a sandbar in the Thames Estuary. The station did not last and it returned to the air as KING Radio, which in turn gave way to Radio 390 after a considerable financial investment had been made in the company and broadcasting site.

Radio 390 was unique in that it had a good quality signal and transmitted a wide variety of programs from easy music to serials, children's programs, business programs, religious programs, plus news and weather bulletins. An episode of Patrick McGoohan's "Danger Man" (known in the U.S. as "Secret Agent Man") called "The Not-So-Jolly Roger" was filmed on Red Sands Fort in early 1966 when "Radio 390" was broadcasting (shut down a year later). The episode was broadcast 4 July of the same year.

Radio Sutch broadcasting from Shivering Sands in 1964, a sandbar which was the location of another complex of towers (originally seven, though only five remained connected and one had capsized) off South-east England, which had also been a WWII British Army Fort left unstaffed after the war. Radio Sutch was named after its founder, the British rock artist Screaming Lord Sutch who took his style and a part of his name from the American artist Screamin' Jay Hawkins. In September of that year Sutch sold the station to his musical manager Reg Calvert, who renamed it Radio City and set about upgrading its equipment.

1965
Radio Essex broadcast from a World War II Royal Navy barge which had been originally fitted with a sea fort and then towed to and sunk upon Knock John sandbar. This station was created by Roy Bates, who later made claims that he had created the Principality of Sealand on yet another disused Royal Navy sunken barge. Radio Essex discovered that its location was within British territorial waters and following a court summons the station attempted to reinvent itself in 1966 as BBMS—Britain's Better Music Station. This low-power station mainly covered parts of the counties of Essex, Kent and East Anglia.

Radio Scotland (also known as Radio Scotland and Ireland) at various locations along the coast of Scotland and Northern Ireland from the former lightship Comet. The station was the creation of Tommy Shields.

1966
The Radio City Death: Reginald Calvert, the manager of Screaming Lord Sutch and the owner of Radio City, was shot dead at the home of Major Oliver Smedley in 1966 following falling out over a joint venture financing arrangement between Radio City and Radio Caroline. Calvert's former business associates had boarded his station, removed the transmitter crystals and put the station off the air.

Due in part to the sensational death of Reg Calvert and lurid tales depicting real swashbuckling piracy, the British government were finally able to bring in legislation to make offshore broadcasting a part of British criminal law in the United Kingdom. Radio City stopped broadcasting after Mrs Calvert appeared in court charged under the Wireless Telegraphy Act 1947. The station was said to be broadcasting within the 3-mile (6 km) limit. Radio City closed down shortly after Mrs Calvert lost the case.

SRE—Swinging Radio England aboard the MV Laissez Faire anchored off south-eastern England. This station was also created and financed by Don Pierson and his business associates in Texas.

SRE followed a fast-paced "All-American" top 40 radio format similar to KBOX in Dallas, Texas, but the American disc jockeys had also grafted on a hybrid 'boss jocks' formula which had been employed by RKO stations in the USA, although the hybrid was far more forceful and pounding than the original. The PAMS jingles used by SRE were the resung versions of those first used by WABC in New York City. SRE arrived around the time of the death of Reg Calvert, owner of Radio City and the political drive to bring in legislation to shut the offshore stations down. These and other unfortunate development brought about the rapid demise of SRE.

At first the Texas owners wanted to rename the station Radio Holland and broadcast in Dutch to the Netherlands. Their plans went ahead after the name Radio Dolfijn had been selected instead. However, it was not long before the station changed its name yet again to Radio 227 as a hybrid of a hybrid SRE in Dutch. This station closed in 1967 just prior to the Marine Broadcasting Offences Act becoming law.

Britain Radio which called itself the Hallmark of Quality, was a beautiful music format station in 1966. Its jingles also came from PAMS in Dallas and it shared something in common with SRE. Both stations were located in studios built in a container which had been lowered into the hold of the MV Laissez Faire. This station was also created and originally financed by friends and associates of Don Pierson. However, Britain Radio did not last and it was replaced by Radio 355 managed by Ted Allbeury who had successfully created Radio 390. Broadcasting two stations from the same ship created technical problems that the stations never managed to resolve, so their coverage was always less than they hoped for.

Radio Tower and TV Tower attempted broadcasting in 1966 from another World War II Royal Navy barge which had also been fitted with a sea fort and then towed to and sunk upon Sunk Head sandbar. Only the radio station made test broadcasts and the TV station is alleged to have made a single, but unconfirmed test transmission.

Radio 270 aboard the MV Oceaan VII anchored off the Yorkshire coast of Northeast England in 1966.

The comedy film The Boat That Rocked is a fictionalised and unrealistic view of offshore pirate radio, set in 1966.

1967
Following the introduction of the Marine Broadcasting Offences Act (Marine & Etc. Broadcasting Offences Act) on 14 August 1967 at midnight, the only two offshore radio stations left on the British airwaves were broadcasting from the two Caroline Network stations which had enjoyed a semi-legal status with offices located in London and Liverpool. After the passage of the MBOA, the two stations soon began announcing themselves individually as Radio Caroline International.

1970
The two ship stations of Radio Caroline International eventually ran out of money in early 1968 and a salvage company towed them away for unpaid bills. But when a new and very powerful offshore radio station aboard the MV Mebo II anchored off the coast of South-east England in time for the British General Election, it suddenly switched its name from Radio Northsea International—(RNI), to Radio Caroline and began to lobby for the introduction of licensed commercial radio in the United Kingdom. As a result of this development the British Government resorted to Jamming the station with a succession of increasingly powerful transmitters on the same frequency. After the election Radio Caroline fell silent once more and the radio ship moved back to the Netherlands where it became Radio Northsea International once again. Radio Caroline returned in Autumn 1972 originally off Holland, but 'came home' when it dropped anchor again off England in August 1974, from the MV Mi Amigo. In 1973 Caroline had solved the problem of broadcasting two frequencies simultaneously, although it was not until 1976-8 that this was done for any length time.

1983
In 1980, the MV Mi Amigo sank in a storm. The MV Caroline had been previously scrapped. In 1983 Radio Caroline returned to the airwaves from a larger ship called the MV Ross Revenge, a super-trawler used by Ross Fisheries until the Cod Wars with Iceland.

The radio ship anchored off South-east England and became home to: Radio Caroline in English with part time services known as Caroline Overdrive playing album music programs and Caroline Viewpoint airing sponsored religious programs. Also on board was a Dutch service on another AM frequency (using the same technique as had been used on the Mi Amigo), which was managed under contract to Dutch organizations and known variously as: Radio Monique, Radio 558 and Radio 819.

On shortwave a third station operated a sponsored religious broadcasting station under the name of WMR—World Mission Radio with an over the air mailing address in California, United States. Because of its American address, this station triggered international complaints to the US FCC during 1988 and 1989. The FCC was at that time engaged in legal casework over Radio Newyork International, whose founder had previously been aboard the MV Ross Revenge helping to set up an earlier shortwave radio channel. In defence of its case for Radio Newyork International lawyers had submitted briefs to the US District Court citing the examples of Radio Caroline and the Voice of Peace as offshore broadcasting stations that had been left alone unchallenged by governmental interference. On 19 August 1989, Dutch authorities with British assistance, raided the MV Ross Revenge and shut down all transmissions.

1984
Laser 558 broadcast from the MV Communicator and within a matter of months it gained an audience of millions. Lack of advertising due to UK laws starved the station off the air. However, it did return briefly in 1986 as Laser Hot Hits but the station did not last for the same reasons as before. The legacy of the original Laser 558 was in its impact upon British broadcasting at the time, because it forced licensed stations to take note of the success of this short-lived offshore station and to attempt to incorporate its ideas and some of its personnel into their own programming.

1990
On 5 November 1990, the last "pirate" broadcast was made from the MV Ross Revenge and Radio Caroline in international waters; bringing to a close the story of Offshore Radio for the United Kingdom. After remaining silent for over a year, the vessel ran aground on the Goodwin Sands during a storm. Shortly after, the "Ross" was towed into port at Dover, England on 22 November 1991. Details of subsequent, legal, operations of Radio Caroline can be found under its own article.

Many household names that later broadcast from the BBC started their careers with the offshore broadcasters, including : Tony Blackburn, Dave Cash, Kenny Everett, John Peel (briefly), Emperor Rosko, Keith Skues, Ed Stewart, Dave Lee Travis and Johnnie Walker.

References

Europe
Radio in Europe